Park Ji-woo (born December 6, 1980) is a South Korean dancer. He started dancing in sixth grade, and studied in British dancesport school. He won a silver medal in the rumba at the 2005 Asian Indoor Games and bronze medal in the five dances at the 2005 Asian Indoor Games with his older sister Park Ji-eun.

Filmography

Television series

References

External links
 

1980 births
Living people
South Korean male dancers
Seoul Arts High School alumni
Yewon Arts University alumni
Hanyang University alumni
South Korean male television actors